Topsy-Turvy is the debut studio album by the American rock band The Apex Theory, now Mt. Helium. Released on April 2, 2002, it was the band's last release as a quartet, with the vocalist Ontronik Khachaturian leaving the band shortly after the album's release. After attempting to audition for a new vocalist, it was decided that the guitarist Art Karamian would take over as the band's vocalist. For its 18 year anniversary, in 2020 it was announced on The Apex Theory Instagram account the limited pressing of Topsy-Turvy on 180g Vinyl for the very first time. Serj Tankian (System of a Down) repos it. To bring awareness and raise funds for the crisis in Armenia, all proceeds after costs will be donated to Armenia Fund.

Style 

PopMatters described the album as "an energy-filled fusion of progressive and modern rock." Allmusic compared the album to the music of At the Drive-In and Incubus.

Reception 
Topsy-Turvy peaked at #6 on the Billboard Heatseekers chart and #157 on the Billboard 200.

Track listing

Personnel
The Apex Theory
 Ontronik Khachaturian — vocals
 Art Karamian — guitar
 Dave Hakopyan — bass guitar
 Sammy J. Watson — drums

References

2002 debut albums
Mt. Helium albums
DreamWorks Records albums